Hetman Bohdan Khmelnytsky Regiment is the name of:

  unit of Ukrainian People's Army in times of First liberation struggle in 1917.
 Hetman Bohdan Khmelnytsky Presidential Regiment modern unit of Ukrainian Armed Forces, household troops for President of Ukraine.

See also 
 Bohdan Khmelnytsky
 Bohdan Khmelnytskyi , a modern unit of Ukrainian Air Force
 , the academy of the State Border Service of Ukraine
 Bohdan Khmelnytskyi , the former higher military educational institution of Ukraine, 1994–2007

Military units and formations of Ukraine
Regiments of Ukraine